The fifth season of Two and a Half Men originally aired on CBS from September 24, 2007, to May 19, 2008. A total of only 19 episodes were aired due to the 2007–2008 Writers Guild of America strike. Unlike the previous seasons, the Season 5 DVD came without a gag reel. The DVD also titled "Tight's Good" as "Shoes, Hats, Pickle Jar Lids", and the "Previously on Two and a Half Men" recap seen in the original broadcast of "Fish in a Drawer" was initially not  included on DVD. This was the shortest season in the history of the show until the eighth season ended after 16 episodes due to the firing of Charlie Sheen.

Cast

Main
 Charlie Sheen as Charlie Harper
 Jon Cryer as Alan Harper
 Angus T. Jones as Jake Harper
 Marin Hinkle as Judith Harper-Melnick
 Conchata Ferrell as Berta
 Holland Taylor as Evelyn Harper-Leopold

Recurring
 Melanie Lynskey as Rose
 Ming-Na Wen as Judge Linda
 Robert Wagner as Teddy Leopold ( Nathan Krunk)
 Jenny McCarthy as Courtney (a.k.a. Sylvia Fishman)
 Kimberly Quinn as Donna

Guest

 Janeane Garofalo as Sharon
 Jennifer Taylor as Nina
 Richard Kind as Artie
 Justine Eyre as Gabrielle
 Cerina Vincent as Lulu
 Christina Moore as Cynthia Sullivan
 Carrie Reichenbach as Alexis
 Kathryn Gordon as Jess
 Hayley Erin as Milly
 Jane Lynch as Dr. Linda Freeman
 Emmanuelle Vaugier as Mia
 Jamie Rose as Sloane Jagov
 Michael Lowry as Wes Tosterone
 Susan Blakely as Angie
 Coby Ryan McLaughlin as Jeremy
 Virginia Williams as Tricia

Writers' strike
Production on the show was halted on November 6, 2007 because of the 2007–2008 Writers Guild of America strike, which began on November 5, 2007 and ended on February 12, 2008. The show returned on March 17, 2008 with 9 episodes to conclude the fifth season.

Episodes

US Nielsen ratings

References

General references 
 
 
 

Season 5
2007 American television seasons
2008 American television seasons